Haereta cryphimaea is a moth in the family Depressariidae. It was described by Alfred Jefferis Turner in 1947. It is found in Australia, where it has been recorded from Queensland.

References

Moths described in 1947
Depressariinae